Pablo Picasso (1881–1973) was a Spanish painter and sculptor.

Picasso may also refer to:

People with the surname Picasso
Ana María Picasso (born 1984), Peruvian journalist and TV host
Bernard Ruiz-Picasso (born 1959), Belgian businessman and art collector
Claude Picasso (born 1947), French cinematographer and businessman
Diana Widmaier Picasso (born 1974), French art historian
Florian Picasso (born 1990), French DJ and great-grandson of the artist, Pablo Picasso
Francisco Picasso (born 1982), Uruguayan professional medley swimmer
Lamberto Picasso (1880–1962), Italian film actor
Marie Picasso (born 1979), Swedish singer, host and model
Marina Picasso (born 1950), French humanitarian
Maya Widmaier-Picasso (1935–2022), French art expert
Paloma Picasso (born 1949), fashion designer and businesswoman, daughter of Pablo Picasso and Françoise Gilot
Renzo Picasso (1880–1975), Italian architect, engineer, and urban planner and designer

People with the first name Picasso
Picasso Nelson (born 1973), American football player

Places
Torre Picasso (Picasso Tower), a 43-story skyscraper in Madrid, Spain
Musée Picasso (Picasso museum), a mansion in Paris, France that contains over 3000 works of art by Pablo Picasso
Museu Picasso (Picasso museum), in Barcelona, Spain which contains over 3500 works of art by Pablo Picasso
Museo Picasso, in Málaga, Spain
Bobigny – Pablo Picasso (Paris Métro), a station of the Paris Métro, the eastern terminus of line 5
Picasso (crater), a crater on Mercury
Picasso (restaurant), in Las Vegas

In technology
 The PICASSO (dark matter) physics experiment, the Project in Canada to Search for Supersymmetric Objects
 Picasso 96, a product line of graphics cards for the Amiga computer family
 AMD Picasso, codename for AMD's line of Ryzen APUs using the Zen+ CPU architecture and the Vega GPU architecture
 Citroën Picasso (disambiguation), a series of compact MPV models produced by the French automaker Citroën
 Picasso was a moniker for the SNCF Class X 3800 diesel railcars

In arts and entertainment
 Picasso, the second season of the American television series, Genius, broadcast by the National Geographic channel
 Picasso (band), a Japanese rock band, most known for several theme songs for the anime television series Maison Ikkoku 
 "Pablo Picasso" (song), written by Jonathan Richman for the group The Modern Lovers
 "Pablo Picasso", a song on the album The Clarence Greenwood Recordings by Citizen Cope 
 Picasso, a character, played by Kendal Nagorcka, on the children's show The Shak 
 Pikasso guitar, a custom-made guitar (42 strings, three necks) played from Pat Metheny
 Picasso (album), an album by the David Murray Octet
 Picasso (play), a 2003 play by Jeffrey Hatcher
 Picasso (film), a 2019 Marathi language film

Other uses
 Picasso triggerfish, a triggerfish found in the reefs of the Indo-Pacific region
 Picasso bug, a species of Hemipteran found in Africa

See also
 Picasa, a computer image editing program
 Pigcasso, a South African painting pig named after Pablo Picasso